Richard Alan Bladt (born December 9, 1946) is an American former professional baseball player and an outfielder who appeared in 62 career games in Major League Baseball for the  Chicago Cubs and  New York Yankees. He attended Foothill College.

He worked his way through the Cubs' minor league system and made his debut with the big league club on June 15, 1969 in the first game of a doubleheader against the Cincinnati Reds, pinch-running for Hall of Famer Billy Williams. He started the second game of the doubleheader, and after lining into a double play in his first at-bat, he singled in a run off Gerry Arrigo for his first major league hit. Williams then replaced Bladt as a pinch-hitter in the sixth inning. Bladt would appear in eight more games in June before being sent back to the minors.

Bladt was the player to be named later that completed a trade between the Cubs and Yankees in January . The Cubs sent a minor leaguer and cash, along with a player to be named later, in exchange for Jimmie Hall on September 11, 1969. The transfer of Bladt completed the deal. He made his Yankee debut on July 19 and remained with the team through the end of the season. Bladt hit his first (and only) major league home run on August 23, 1975 off Andy Hassler of the California Angels, and he spent September as the Yankees' everyday center fielder, replacing Elliott Maddox. After another year in the minors, however, the Yankees traded Bladt along with Maddox to the Baltimore Orioles for Paul Blair on January 20, 1977. Bladt never returned to the major leagues.

Bladt's 62 MLB games played included 37 starts as an outfielder, batting .215 with 12 runs batted in. His 28 career hits included three doubles and a triple, in addition to his home run.

References

Sources

1946 births
Living people
Águilas del Zulia players
American expatriate baseball players in Venezuela
Arizona Instructional League Cubs players
Baseball players from California
Chicago Cubs players
Dallas–Fort Worth Spurs players
Foothill College alumni
Leones del Caracas players
Lodi Crushers players
Major League Baseball outfielders
New York Yankees players
People from Santa Cruz, California
Quincy Cubs players
Rochester Red Wings players
Syracuse Chiefs players
Tacoma Cubs players
Treasure Valley Cubs players
Junior college baseball players in the United States